Valery Konstantinovich Nikolin (4 December 1939 – 15 December 2000) was a Russian sailor. He competed in the Dragon class at the 1964 Summer Olympics and placed ninth. Domestically Nikolin won three Soviet titles, in 1963, 1965 and 1968. After retiring from competitions he worked as a sailing coach.

References

1939 births
2000 deaths
Soviet male sailors (sport)
Olympic sailors of the Soviet Union
Sailors at the 1964 Summer Olympics – Dragon